WORD (950 kHz), known on-air as "The Fan Upstate", is a sports-formatted AM radio station in the Greenville-Spartanburg area of Upstate South Carolina. The Audacy, Inc. outlet is licensed by the Federal Communications Commission (FCC) to Spartanburg, South Carolina, and broadcasts with a power of 5,000 watts during the day and 65 watts at night using a non-directional antenna. The programming on WORD is simultaneously broadcast on WYRD 1330 AM Greenville,W249DL 97.7 MHz, Greenville and W246CV 97.1 MHz, Spartanburg. "The Fan Upstate" format can also be heard on WFBC-HD3, Greenville. WORD's transmitter is located on the aptly named Broadcast Drive in Spartanburg, while its studios are in Greenville.

History
WORD signed on September 1, 1940, at 910 AM as Spartanburg's second radio station. under the ownership of Spartanburg Advertising Company which also owned WSPA, a station that was established a decade previous. WORD utilized studio and tower space from WSPA.

In 1944 the FCC ordered the WSPA-WORD combo to be broken up due to ownership regulations which prohibited an owner from having more than one AM station per market. This was completed on March 17, 1947, when WORD was sold to Spartan Radiocasting. Sister FM station WDXY (100.5 FM) signed on the air April 14, 1948, but would sign off the air by the end of the 1950s.

In 1952, a dispute erupted between both Spartan Radiocasting and Liberty Life over a proposed allocation for VHF TV channel 7 in Spartanburg. It was settled in 1958 when Spartan Radiocasting bought back WSPA-AM and FM from Liberty Life Insurance and spinning off WORD and WDXY to different ownership.

WORD was well known as Spartanburg's Top 40 powerhouse in the 1960s and 1970s under the name "Big Word".  Some of the South's heavy weights worked there during the 1970s that included Russ Spooner, Bob Canada, Kemosabi Joe Johnson, Fred Hardy and Robert W. Morgan (not the same Morgan that worked at KHJ) though. The Inimitable MojoMan (Sid D. Grubbs) also worked there in the 1970s. By the 1980s, WORD faced declining audience shares from FM competitors WANS and WFBC-FM, and switched to various formats before going dark in 1989. In October 1990, WORD signed back on as a simulcast of WFBC from Greenville as both stations switched to News/Talk with WFBC becoming WYRD in the mid-90s.

In 2002, Entercom Communications moved the "News Radio WORD" format from the weaker 910 AM, which previously held the WORD callsign, to 950 AM.  The programming at 950 AM was then moved to 910 AM, along with the WSPA calls.  WSPA at 910 has since been sold and is now WOLI.

WORD's transmitter is located near the Spartanburg Community College campus (3 miles northwest of downtown Spartanburg) at 245 Broadcast Drive. Its general coverage area is from Gaffney to Greer (Spartanburg Metro), with secondary coverage in the Greenville area.  Although WORD transmits with 5,000 watts of power like its counterpart, WYRD, its signal is somewhat stronger due to its lower dial position.

The station added WYRD-FM, at 106.3 on the dial, as a second simulcast partner in 2008.

Until its change in format from talk to sports on February 24, 2014, News Radio WORD carried Russ and Lisa, Mike Gallagher, Coast to Coast AM, Rush Limbaugh, Kim Komando, Lars Larson, Dave Ramsey, Sean Hannity and Bob McLain.

On March 23, 2022, WORD rebranded as "The Fan Upstate" and switched affiliations from ESPN Radio to CBS Sports Radio and BetQL Network.

References

External links
FCC History Cards for WORD

Sports radio stations in the United States
ORD
Radio stations established in 1930
Audacy, Inc. radio stations
1930 establishments in South Carolina
CBS Sports Radio stations